The Day of Resistance to Occupation of the Autonomous Republic of Crimea and the City of Sevastopol is an annual designated day in Ukraine, commemorating a 2014 demonstration by thousands of Crimean Tatars outside the parliament of the Autonomous Republic of Crimea. It took place on the day before Russian Federation soldiers took armed control of the parliament in preparation for the annexation of Crimea.

History
It was celebrated once in 2016 in accordance with a resolution of the Verkhovna Rada of Ukraine on 2 February 2016. The holiday was created officially by a decree of president Volodymyr Zelensky and first observed on 26 February 2021.

References 

Public holidays in Ukraine
February observances
2021 establishments in Ukraine
Recurring events established in 2021
Winter events in Ukraine
Annexation of Crimea by the Russian Federation
Politics of Crimea
Politics of the Crimean Tatars